Bekily is a town in the region of Androy and in the former Toliara Province, Madagascar. It is situated at the Menarandra River in the South of Madagascar.

An airport serves the town.

Populated places in Atsimo-Andrefana